Stony Point or Stoney Point may refer to:

in Australia
Stony Point railway line, Melbourne
Stony Point railway station
Stony Point, New South Wales, Australia

in Canada
 Kettle and Stony Point Reserve, Ontario
Stoney Point, Ontario, a hamlet in Canada

in the United States
 Stony Point, California, former name of Lakeport, California
Stoney Point (California), a rocky hill in Chatsworth, Los Angeles, California popular with rock climbers.
Stoney Point, Tampa, Florida, a neighborhood in Tampa
Stony Point, Kentucky
Stony Point (Lexington, Kentucky), listed on the NRHP in Kentucky
Stony Point, Michigan
 Stony Point, New York
 Stony Point (CDP), New York, a community within the town
 The Battle of Stony Point, a battle in the American Revolutionary War
 Stony Point Battlefield
 Stony Point, Oklahoma
 Stony Point, North Carolina
 Stony Point (Greenwood, South Carolina), listed on the NRHP in South Carolina, in Greenwood County
Stony Point (Surgoinsville, Tennessee), listed on the NRHP in Tennessee
Stony Point High School in Round Rock, Texas
 In Virginia
 Stony Point, Virginia, in Albemarle County.
 Stony Point (Richmond, Virginia), a neighborhood in Southside, Richmond, Virginia where the Stony Point Fashion Park (a regional upscale mall) is located

de:Stoney Point